The 2010 Jordan Rally was the third round of the 2010 World Rally Championship season. The rally was also the third round of both the Production Car World Rally Championship, and the Super 2000 World Rally Championship. Sébastien Loeb won the 56th WRC rally of his career, taking the lead midway through the second leg, and holding on to win by 35.8 seconds ahead of Jari-Matti Latvala, who had been the pacesetter on the first day. Petter Solberg finished third, taking his second successive podium after his second in Mexico. 

Much of the talk on the rally was down to controversial team orders in relation to road position. Citroën Junior Team's Sébastien Ogier left the final morning's service five minutes late, getting a time penalty that dropped him behind Ford's Latvala. Ford used Mikko Hirvonen – who had retired on the first day, and was returning under SupeRally conditions – as their hand, to leave service early so he jumped up the running order. Citroën countered by making Ogier check into the time control at SS14 eight minutes early, to road sweep ahead of Loeb. Citroën later stated that Ogier's late departure was due to an electrical problem. Ogier's teammate Kimi Räikkönen finished eighth and became the second driver after Carlos Reutemann to score drivers' championship points in both Formula One and the World Rally Championship.

In the SWRC, Xavier Pons won his second consecutive event, and again managed to break into the top ten placings in the overall standings. His margin of victory over Eyvind Brynildsen was nearly twelve minutes, as he moved into a ten-point lead in the SWRC standings. Sweden victor Per-Gunnar Andersson finished third ahead of Nasser Al-Attiyah, Patrik Sandell and Jari Ketomaa.

In the PWRC, Patrik Flodin took his second victory in two starts, beating Armindo Araújo by close to two minutes. Araújo's second place was enough to maintain his lead in the championship standings, but Flodin now trails by just eight points. Nicholai Georgiou finished third.

Results

Event standings

Special stages

Standings after the rally

Drivers' Championship standings

Manufacturers' Championship standings

References

External links 
 Results at eWRC.com

Jordan
Rally